K13 Harpe Bru Bridge is the first extradosed cable-stayed bridge in Norway.

Technical information:

 Extradosed Stay Cable Bridge (Length 320m)
 spans 45+65+100+65+45m
 foundations – piles/flat (founded on rock)
 pylons height 16,0m

Owner:

 Statens Vegvesen

Design:

 Johs Holt AS

Checking engineering:

 COWI AS

Contractor:

 Implenia Construction SA

Completion: October 2015

References 

Extradosed bridges in Norway
Road bridges in Norway